Rathnure St Anne's is a Gaelic Athletic Association club based in Rathnure, County Wexford, Ireland. Rathnure's most famous players are the Rackards and Quigley brothers.

First AGM

At a meeting in Rathnure in the year 1931, Rathnure St Anne's GAA Club was founded. Founder members on that night were Pat Byrne, James O'Leary, Pat Doyle, Thomas Murphy, Nick Mernagh, Denis Brennan and Master O'Rielly. Also on the night, the meeting was attended by two 14-year-old boys Mikey Redmond and Ned Caulfield. The first Chairman of the club was Mr. Hugh O'Rielly, the first Secretary was Pat Byrne and the first Treasurer was Pat Doyle.

Early years
In its first year in existence, Rathnure fielded in junior hurling. However success in terms of championship medals was slow, but more important players were given the opportunity to play their native game, a game that was eventually to flourish in the parish of Rathnure. From the outset great interest was aroused in the club, and it gradually grew in strength both from a players and a supporters point of view.
After just seven years in existence Rathnure finally succeeded in making that magical breakthrough to a County Final. This was in the junior grade and with many young hurlers in the team it augured well for the future of the club. In this final Rathnure were opposed by St Fintan's, the south Wexford club with a tremendous hurling reputation, a club that had many fine achievements to its credit up to then. This match was described as the hurling spectacle of the year and signalled the arrival of Rathnure as a hurling force in the model county. The final score was St. Fintan's 4–5 Rathnure 5–0.

First success
The following year, Rathnure were represented again in the county junior hurling final. This time however, it was a winning one and proved a historic breakthrough for the club. A member of that history making team was Nicky Rackard, a man who was to lead both club and county to historic victories in the ensuing years. In the final Rathnure defeated Horeswood by 6–1 to 1–2. The winners were never seriously challenged and proved the superior team in every aspect of the game, with Nicky Rackard coming off with two splendid goals to his credit.

Senior success
1941 was Rathnure's first year in senior hurling ranks and it is notable that the club has fielded in the Wexford Senior Hurling Championship every other year to date, a feat not equalled by any other club in the county and very few in Ireland. In 1948 Rathnure St Anne's won our first of 20 Wexford Senior Hurling Championships. There were celebrations lasting for a full week after that County Final. Further victories came in 1950, '55, '61, '67, '71, '72, '73, '74, '77, '79, '80, '86, '87, '90, '96, '98, '02, '03 and 2006. Following 6 of the above county successes, Leinster Club titles were also won.

Other successes
Other titles won over the years include Senior football, Intermediate hurling, Junior A & B football, Junior A hurling (3), Junior B hurling (3), U21 hurling (9), including 6 in a row, Minor hurling (14), Juvenile hurling (14), Under 14 hurling (7), Under 12 hurling (3), All Ireland Feile na nGael, Minor football and U14 football.

Rathnure legends
Rathnure not only boasts of great achievements, but also of some hurling legends – Nicky, Billy & Bobby Rackard, Dan, John, Martin and Pat Quigleys, Barrons, O' Connors, Codds, Redmonds, Morrisseys, John Conran, Jimmy Holohan and Fr. McDonald to mention just a few.

Nicky Rackard Park
A large indoor arena, two full-sized playing pitches and an underage pitch at Nicky Rackard Park caters for all ages of girls and boys. Its sports complex consists of four full-sized dressing rooms, squash court, fully equipped gymnasium, sauna and a well-stocked GAA shop. The clubhouse also contains an historic trophy and meeting room dedicated to Syl Barron.

Camogie
Rathnure camogie club won the All-Ireland Senior Club Camogie Championship in 1995. They won further Leinster club championships in 1992, 1996 and 2000
The club was founded in 1968 by Teddy O’Connor, Larry Cahill, Marcella Redmond, Tish Codd and Syl Barron. 
The club won Community Games and Féile na nGael titles were won. The late Jim Shiels and his wife Margaret were great workers for the club. Cloughbawn joined forces with Rathnure in 1988 and, in the following year, Rathnure won the Wexford senior championship title

Honours

Hurling

All-Ireland Senior Club Hurling Championships:
 Winner (0):
 Runner-up (5): 1972, 1974, 1978, 1987, 1999
Leinster Senior Club Hurling Championships:
 Winner (6): 1971, 1973, 1977, 1986, 1987, 1998
 Runner-up (2): 1970, 1972
Wexford Senior Club Hurling Championships:
 Winner (20): 1948, 1950, 1955, 1961, 1967, 1971, 1972, 1973, 1974, 1977, 1979, 1980, 1986, 1987, 1990, 1996, 1998, 2002, 2003, 2006
 Runner-up (9): 1942, 1949, 1957, 1965, 1978, 1988, 1999, 2004, 2011
 Wexford Intermediate Hurling Championships: 1
 1971
 Wexford Junior Hurling Championships: 3
 1940, 1981, 1983, 2018
 Wexford Under-21 Hurling Championships: 10
 1970 (with Duffry Rovers), 1971 (with Duffry Rovers), 1983 (with Cushinstown), 1991, 1995, 1996, 1997, 1998, 1999, 2000, 2016.
 Wexford Minor Hurling Championships: 14
 1941, 1942, 1945, 1963, 1964, 1973 (with Duffry Rovers), 1980 (with Cushinstown), 1983 (with Cushinstown), 1992, 1993, 1994, 1996, 1997, 2001, 2013.

Gaelic football

 Wexford Senior Club Football Championships:
 Winner (1): 1972
 Runner-up (2): 1953, 1974
 Wexford Junior Football Championships: 1
 1950

Notable players
 Martin Codd
 Paul Codd
 Jim English
 Dermot Flynn
 Rod Guiney
 Nigel Higgins
 Séamus Murphy
 Brendan O'Leary
 Dan Quigley
 John Quigley
 Martin Quigley
 Billy Rackard
 Bobby Rackard
 Nicky Rackard

References

External links
Wexford GAA site
Rathnure St. Anne’s GAA site

Gaelic games clubs in County Wexford
Hurling clubs in County Wexford
Gaelic football clubs in County Wexford